Mezraa can refer to:

 Mezraa, Doğanyol
 Mezraa, Kemah
 Mezraa, Hınıs
 Mezraa railway station
 Mezraa, Vezirköprü